Rosenhayn Synagogue is an 1898 synagogue located in Rosenhayn, New Jersey.  It is one of fewer than 100 surviving nineteenth century synagogue buildings in the United States.

The wooden, gabled, clapboard building was erected by a local Jewish agricultural colony.

References

Buildings and structures in Cumberland County, New Jersey
Synagogues in New Jersey
Religious buildings and structures in Cumberland County, New Jersey